The Fairchild C-26 "Metroliner" is the designation for the Fairchild Swearingen Metroliner series twin turboprop aircraft in the service of the United States military. It was not officially named by the US Armed Forces, but is unofficially known by the same name as its civilian counterpart. The C-26A is the military version of the Model SA227-AC Metro III; the C-26B is the military version of the Model SA227-BC Metro III and Model SA227-DC Metro 23; and UC-26C is the military designation for the Model SA227-AT Merlin IVC.

Design and development
The United States Air Force bought eleven C-26A aircraft based on the SA227-AC, two of these being supplied to the Venezuelan Air Force. The first three C-26Bs were procured later in the 1980s, two for the US Army and one for the USAF. These three had been built as SA227-BC models. Later C-26Bs were the military equivalent of the Metro 23 and the USAF took delivery of 37 examples. Some of these were transferred to the Peruvian Air Force and the US Army, while six were transferred to the US Navy as C-26Ds. The US Army also took a second-hand Merlin IVC and operated it as the solitary UC-26C.

A Metro III, c/n AC-614, was modified as the Fairchild Aircraft/Lockheed Multi Mission Surveillance Aircraft, featuring a Lockheed phased array radar in a long pod under the fuselage. Several aspects of the MMSA aircraft were incorporated on some USAF C-26s redesignated as the RC-26B, operated by the Air National Guard (ANG) in various states.  These aircraft have been primarily used for Department of Defense reconnaissance mission support to various agencies of the Department of Homeland Security such as the United States Coast Guard (USCG) and Customs and Border Protection (CBP) in the War on Drugs, and to USCG and/or the Federal Emergency Management Agency (FEMA) in the wake of natural disasters. The RC-26B aircraft were originally configured with a belly pod containing a sensor turret and a data recorder. Recently, this pod has been removed and a sensor turret has been added to the belly of the aircraft. Some of the RC-26Bs were operated for a time with civil registrations. On 4 February 2019, a contract for Elbit Systems of America to provide an avionics upgrade to the Air National Guard's RC-26Bs was announced.

The U.S. Navy operates several C-26D aircraft, modified for range support, at the Pacific Missile Range Facility at Barking Sands in Hawaii.

Operational history
In early June 2020, the US National Guard deployed an RC-26B to El Dorado Hills near Sacramento, California, apparently in response to a walking tour by young black entrepreneurs. The deployment occurred without the knowledge or approval of Gavin Newsom, the Governor of California. Three more RC-26Bs were used to observe demonstrators in Minneapolis, Phoenix and Washington, D.C.

In January 2023, the U.S. Air Force retired its RC-26B Condors.

Variants
 C-26A
 Military version of the Metro III (Model SA227-AC).
 C-26B
 Military version of the Metro III (Model SA227-BC) and Metro 23 (Model SA227-DC).
 RC-26B
 C-26B modified with electronic surveillance equipment for drug interdiction missions. Ten remain in service with the Air National Guard as of March 2019.
 UC-26C
 Was a used 1983-built Merlin IVC operated for several years as 89-1471. Modified with an integrated sensor package including forward-looking infrared and high resolution radar.
 C-26D
 C-26Bs transferred from USAF inventory and modified with new navigation equipment for the US Navy, four used for rapid response cargo and passenger transportation in Europe.
 EC-26D
 One range support aircraft operated by the US Navy's Pacific Missile Range Facility at Barking Sands.
 RC-26D
 Two range support aircraft operated by the US Navy's Pacific Missile Range Facility at Barking Sands with installed radar units.
 C-26E
 Upgrade of 11 C-26B aircraft including an improved Rockwell Collins Proline 21 Electronic Flight Instrument System.

Operators
Barbados
 Barbados Air Wing – Regional Security System 2 C-26A
Colombia
 Colombian Air Force
 Colombian National Police
Mexico
 Mexican Air Force - 2 as of December 2018.
Peru
 Peruvian Air Force - 3 as of December 2018.
Trinidad and Tobago
 Trinidad and Tobago Air Guard - 2 as of December 2018.
United States
 United States Army
 United States Navy
Venezuela
 Venezuelan Air Force - 1 as of December 2018.

Former
United States
 United States Air Force

Specifications (C-26A)

See also

References

Bibliography

 Donald, David, general editor. Encyclopedia of World Aircraft. Etobicoke, ON: Prospero Books, 1997. .
 Endes, Günter. "Fairchild (Swearingen) Metro/Merlin". The Illustrated Directory of Modern Commercial Aircraft. St. Paul, Minnesota: MBI Publishing Company, 2001. .
 Frawley, Gerard. "Fairchild Dornier Metro II, III & 23". The International Directory of Civil Aircraft. Canberra: Aerospace Publications Pty. Ltd., 1997. .
 Hoyle, Craig. "World Air Forces Directory". Flight International. 4–10 December 2018, Vol. 194, No. 5665, pp. 32–60. .
 Palmer, Trisha, ed. "Swearingen Metro and Metro II/III". Encyclopedia of the World's Commercial and Private Aircraft. New York: Crescent Books, 2001. .
 Pittaway, Nigel. "Elbit to upgrade Condors". Air International, March 2019, Volume 96, No. 3. p. 31.

External links

 US Navy C-26 Fact File 
 Virtual Museum – Fairchild
 Reported plans for retirement of RC-26B, CNN

C-026
Swearingen aircraft
1970s United States airliners
Twin-turboprop tractor aircraft